Octobans, also known as  tube toms, are deep, small diameter, single-head tom-toms. Octobans were originally grouped in melodically-tuned sets of eight, hence the name, in reference to octave and from octo meaning "eight".

Part sets of two or four drums or an individual drum or octo are common additions to a drum kit.

Complete and half sets of octobans are commonly mounted in clusters of four, in a square pattern. Mounts for four drums in a straight line, dual mounts for two drums, and individual mounts are all also reasonably common.

History

Octobans were introduced by Tama Drums in 1978, and endorsed by Billy Cobham, at that time one of the most popular drummers who had switched to Tama drums. Tama octobans were made with fiberglass using a patented molding process. The naked shells were then painted in black lacquer (the raw color is something close to light brown, visible inside the shell where not completely painted). Since they were designed as rack toms the attachment was different from the regular tom toms, it was basically the same one used for the concert toms. The rims were conveniently shaped in order to offer the maximum area available for the stick, 6" being quite hard to hit. The lugs (4) were the same model used for the Swingstar series drum kits of the same period. The shell was a 6" diameter, (150 mm on outside diameter), thickness was 5 mm despite the very first series may have been 4 mm as advertised. A  variation was  produced in late '70  using plexiglas instead of fiberglass for the shell construction. This material was considerably more fragile than fiberglass. The Tama production line offered, in the 78-84 period, the complete 8 piece set or, for those who did not need the whole set, two sub sets, of four pieces each, the low pitch (the longest) set and the high pitch set. The most famous drummers used the low pitch set, such as Stewart Copeland for the whole Police period. The dimensions of the low pitch set of shells were the following (length mm, edge to edge): 810, 733, 667, 607. The high pitch set was dimensioned as follows: 552, 498, 455, 411 mm. Diameter = 6 inch. In 1985 Tama changed its program of production and modified the octobans by reducing the length of the shells. The low pitch set was discontinued due them being too difficult to transport on stage. The lengths which are available to present day are the following: 600, 536, 472, 443, 390, 343, 301, 280 (mm). The only difference with the original model is the lug design and the batter skin is still clear but without the black dot. The different lengths of the cylinders give each drum its distinct tone.

The term octoban has since become a generic trademark used to refer to such sets of smaller diameter tube drums.

Other makers
6" diameter:
 Pearl
 Drum Workshop Rata Tom.
 ddrum Deccabon.
Other diameters:
 Meinl Percussion Attack Timbales, 8" diameter.

Octoban drum shells from other manufacturers are of varying lengths, and made from materials like fiberglass, acrylic, aluminum, and wood. Some people build their own octobans out of PVC or similar commercial tubing.

Notable octoban users

References

External links
 Building Tube Toms
 Roger Taylor playing his vintage Octobans in studio 2010
 Stewart Copeland playing Octobans
 Tama Octoban Drum Solo 

Drums
Drum kit components
Pitched percussion instruments
Unpitched percussion instruments
20th-century percussion instruments
Directly struck membranophones